Agni Vyooham is a 1979 Indian Malayalam
film,  directed by P. Chandrakumar and produced by R. S. Prabhu. The film stars Shubha, Sukumaran, Kanakadurga and Sankaradi in the lead roles. The film has musical score by A. T. Ummer.

Cast
Shubha
Sukumaran
Kanakadurga
Sankaradi
Sreelatha Namboothiri
K. P. Ummer
Kunchan
Kuthiravattam Pappu

Soundtrack
The music was composed by A. T. Ummer and the lyrics were written by Sathyan Anthikkad.

References

External links
 

1979 films
1970s Malayalam-language films
Films directed by P. Chandrakumar